Wrinkled frog may refer to:

 Abdulali's wrinkled frog, a frog endemic to the Western Ghats, India
 Deccan wrinkled frog, a frog endemic to the Western Ghats, India
 Giant wrinkled frog, a frog endemic to the Western Ghats, India
 Japanese wrinkled frog, a frog native to Japan
 Kalakad wrinkled frog, a frog endemic to the Western Ghats, India
 Large wrinkled frog, a frog endemic to India
 Pigmy wrinkled frog, a frog endemic to southern Western Ghats of India
 Sacred swamp wrinkled frog, a frog endemic to the Western Ghats, India
 Smith's wrinkled frog, a frog found in Thailand and possibly Myanmar
 Wrinkled ground frog, a frog found in the Philippines, Palau, Fiji, New Guinea, and in the Admiralty, Bismarck, and Solomon Islands

Animal common name disambiguation pages